PT AOA Zamrud Aviation Corporation was an airline in Indonesia which was established in 1969 as a merger of PT Zamrud Airlines and PT Aircraft Owners' Association .

Destinations 
From its base at Ngurah Rai International Airport, Denpasar, Zamrud flies to Bima, Sumbawa Besar, Ampenan, Surabaya, Tambolaka, Waingapu, Kupang, Maumere and Dili.

Accidents incidents 
Zamrud had had 2 accidents:

 1970 in Manado (PK-ZDF),
 1972 in Sumbawa Besar (PK-ZDD).

Zamrud Aviation Corporation stopped operating in 1982 and was incorporated into the airline Airfast Indonesia.

Source 
  Aviation Safety Network
  WORLD AIRLINE DIRECTORY

Defunct airlines of Indonesia
Airlines established in 1969
Airlines disestablished in 1982